The 1990 season was the 85th season of competitive football in Norway.

Men's football

League season

Promotion and relegation

Tippeligaen

2. divisjon

Group A

Group B

3. divisjon

Norwegian Cup

Final

The match was played on 21 October 1990 at the Ullevaal Stadion in Oslo, and opposed two Tippeligaen sides; Fyllingen and Rosenborg. Rosenborg defeated Fyllingen 5–1 to claim the Norwegian Cup for an fifth time in their history.

Women's football

League season

1. divisjon

Norwegian Women's Cup

Final
Asker won 5–1 against Sprint/Jeløy.
Asker 5–1 Sprint/Jeløy

UEFA competitions

European Cup

First round

|}

European Cup Winners' Cup

First round

|}

UEFA Cup

First round

|}

National teams

Norway men's national football team

Results

Norway women's national football team

Results

References

External links
  Norge Menn Senior A, Football Association of Norway 1908–present
 RSSSF.no – National team 1990

 
Seasons in Norwegian football